Phrong Maduea railway station is a railway station in Phrong Maduea Subdistrict, Nakhon Pathom City, Nakhon Pathom, Thailand. It is a class 3 railway station  from Thon Buri railway station.

Train services 
 Ordinary 251/252 Bang Sue Junction-Prachuap Khiri Khan-Bang Sue Junction
 Ordinary 254/255 Lang Suan-Thon Buri-Lang Suan
 Ordinary 257/258 Thon Buri-Nam Tok-Thon Buri
 Ordinary 259/260 Thon Buri-Nam Tok-Thon Buri
 Ordinary 261/262 Bangkok-Hua Hin-Bangkok
 Ordinary 351/352 Thon Buri-Ratchaburi-Thon Buri
 Commuter 355/356 Bangkok-Suphan Buri-Bangkok

References 
 
 

Railway stations in Thailand